Abe no Iratsume (阿倍女郎 or 安倍女郎; dates unknown) was a Japanese waka poet of the Nara period.

Biography 
The exact birth and death dates of Abe no Iratsume (literally, "the lady Abe") are unknown, but she probably lived from around the Wadō era (began 708) to around the Hōki era (ended 780).

Poetry 
Abe no Iratsume is the credited author of five poems included in books III and IV of the Man'yōshū. They are the poems numbered 269, 505–506, 514, and 516. These include a poetic exchange with Nakatomi no Azumahito, the author of poem 515.

An "Abe no Iratsume" (安倍女郎) is mentioned as the recipient of poem 1631 (Book VIII) by Ōtomo no Yakamochi, but this was likely a different woman.

References

Citations

Sources 

 
 

Year of birth unknown
Year of death unknown
Man'yō poets
Japanese women poets